Tomaž Bolčina (born January 6, 1994 in Šempeter pri Gorici, Slovenia) is a Slovenian professional basketball player who last played for KK Skrljevo. He is a 2.08 m tall Center.

References

External links
 Krka profile
 Eurobasket.com profile
 ABA league profile

1994 births
Living people
ABA League players
KK Krka players
KK Šentjur players
People from Šempeter pri Gorici
Slovenian men's basketball players
Centers (basketball)
KK Škrljevo players
Helios Suns players